Edna Stern (born March 6, 1977, in Brussels) is a Belgian-Israeli pianist.

Biography
She was born in Belgium, and grew up in Israel. She began to play piano at the age of six. She studied piano under Viktor Derevianko and Natasha Tadson at the Rubin Academy of Music and Dance in Tel Aviv.

Afterwards she studied at the Chapelle Royale Reine Elisabeth in Brussels, and studied with Martha Argerich. In 1996 she moved to Basel, Switzerland, where she studied for four years as a student of Krystian Zimerman. Later on she took part in masters courses in piano at the International Piano Academy Lake Como under Alicia de Larrocha, Dimitri Bashkirow, Andreas Staier, and Leon Fleisher.

She followed Fleisher to the Peabody Institute of the Johns Hopkins University, in Baltimore, Maryland, for a year. In 2000 she won the international competition, Senigallia, and in 2001 the Juventus Award.

In 2003 she moved to Paris, where she began to deliver historically informed period performances on the fortepiano.

Her first CD, Chaconne, was named the best CD of 2005 by Arte.

Since September 2009 this artist  has been teaching at the Royal College of Music in London.

Repertoire
Her current repertoire varies from Johann Sebastian Bach, Carl Philipp Emanuel Bach, and Luciano Berio to contemporary composers.

CDs
 2005: Chaconne (Pieces from Ferruccio Busoni, Rudolf Lutz, and Johann Sebastian Bach), with Amandine Beyer (violin)
 2008: Sonatas by Carl Philipp Emanuel Bach for violin and keyboard
 2008: Fantasies by Robert Schumann
 2009: Nun komm der Heiden Heiland – Preludes, fugues und chorals by Bach
 2010: Chopin Piano Sonate No. 2 / Préludes
 2010: Mozart Piano Concerto No. 9 Jeune Homme and Concertos Nos 12 & 14 – Edna Stern & Orchestre d'Auvergne – Highly Acclaimed Performance BBC Radio CD Review

References

External links

Edna Stern on THINQon (frozen since 2012)
Biography
Biography at naïve.fr 

1977 births
Academics of the Royal College of Music
Belgian emigrants to Israel
Belgian Jews
Belgian pianists
Belgian women pianists
Israeli Jews
Israeli pianists
Israeli women pianists
Living people
Musicians from Brussels
Peabody Institute alumni
Jewish classical pianists
Belgian women musicians
21st-century classical pianists
Women music educators
Women classical pianists
21st-century women pianists